State Road 312 (NM 312) is a  state highway in the US state of New Mexico. NM 312's western terminus is at NM 252 in McAlister, and the eastern terminus is at NM 268 south of Forrest.

Major intersections

See also

References

312
Transportation in Curry County, New Mexico
Transportation in Quay County, New Mexico